Arnold Viiding (19 March 1911 in Valga, Estonia – 20 October 2006 in Sydney, Australia) was an Estonian shot putter and discus thrower. At the 1936 Summer Olympics, he achieved eighth place in the shot put event with 15.23 metres.

Biography
Viiding graduated from the Tallinn Police School in 1932 and worked as a policeman. In 1936, he joined the academic corporation Fraternitas Estica. In 1940, he graduated from the Faculty of Law at the University of Tartu. After the Nazi occupation in 1941 during the Second World War, Viiding served as the chief of the police school of the Estonian Security Police.

In 1944, Viiding fled the Soviet occupation of Estonia and emigrated first to Germany and in 1949 to Australia. Along with other Estonians, he established a plastics factory, "Arnolds Plastics".

References

External links
 
 
 

1911 births
2006 deaths
Sportspeople from Valga, Estonia
People from the Governorate of Livonia
Estonian male shot putters
Estonian male discus throwers
Olympic athletes of Estonia
Athletes (track and field) at the 1936 Summer Olympics
Athletes from Sydney
European Athletics Championships medalists
Estonian World War II refugees